Deborah Allen (born Deborah Lynn Thurmond on September 30, 1953) is an American country music singer and songwriter. Since 1976, Allen has issued 12 albums and charted 14 singles on the Billboard Hot Country Songs chart. She recorded the 1983 crossover hit "Baby I Lied", which reached No. 4 on the country chart and No. 26 on the Billboard Hot 100. Allen has also written No. 1 singles for herself, Janie Fricke, and John Conlee; top 5 hits for Patty Loveless and Tanya Tucker; and a top 10 hit for the Whites.

Early life and rise to fame 
Allen was born Deborah Lynn Thurmond in Memphis, Tennessee. She was a beauty queen when she was a teenager.

Musically, she was influenced by Elvis Presley, Roy Orbison, Aretha Franklin, Al Green, Ray Charles, the Beatles, the Rolling Stones, Led Zeppelin and the current music which was being played in Memphis on WHBQ and WDIA, as well as country musicians such as Brenda Lee, Patsy Cline, Tammy Wynette, Dolly Parton, Willie Nelson, Waylon Jennings and Johnny Cash. At 19, Allen moved to Nashville to begin pursuing her career in music. She worked a short stint as a waitress at the local Music Row IHOP restaurant. While there one day, Deborah met Roy Orbison and songwriter Joe Melson. Two weeks later, Orbison and Melson, who admired her spunk, decided to hire Allen to sing background on a couple of Orbison tracks.

Allen also auditioned for and landed a job at the Opryland USA theme park. She was soon chosen by Opryland as a featured soloist and dancer for a state department exchange tour of Russia starring Tennessee Ernie Ford.

Upon her return from Russia, Allen gravitated to the Nashville offices of Waylon Jennings, the Tompall & the Glaser Brothers and John Hartford where her close friend, Marie Barrett, worked as a secretary. There she met her soon-to-be songwriting mentor, poet, playwright, artist and songwriter Shel Silverstein. After watching her perform during a happy hour show at the Spence Manor on Nashville's Music Row, Silverstein advised Allen to pursue songwriting as an extension of her creativity and career path.

Allen also began to pursue a singing career in her own right when she was chosen to be a regular on Jim Stafford's ABC summer replacement series. She went on to serve as an opening act for many of Stafford's personal appearances. Jim and producer Phil Gernhard brought Allen back to Nashville to record a CB radio novelty record called "Do You Copy". It was recorded live and was released as a single on Warner Bros. Records. Although she appreciated the opportunity to record with Stafford and Gernhard, Allen was disheartened that after waiting patiently for two years to record her first record, it was a novelty tune. She decided to move back to Nashville to follow her true musical direction.

In 1979, while singing at a private party, she was discovered by producer Bud Logan, who invited her to sing on five unfinished duet tracks by the late Jim Reeves. Three of these songs were "Don't Let Me Cross Over", "Oh, How I Miss You Tonight" and "Take Me in Your Arms and Hold Me". All three duets were released as singles, and made the top 10 on the country charts for Reeves' longtime label, RCA Records. She was billed as "The Mystery Singer" on the first release, an innovative promotion by label head, Joe Galante.

Career peak: 1980s 
In 1980, Allen signed with Capitol Records. Her debut album for the label was 1980's Trouble in Paradise. The album produced her initial solo hit "Nobody's Fool" peaking at No. 24 on the Billboard Country chart. Subsequent chart singles included (although none never made it on to an album) "You (Make Me Wonder Why)", "You Look Like the One I Love" (a song she had co-written) and "After Tonight", co-written by Troy Seals, each peaking at #20, #33 and #82 respectively on the Billboard Country chart.  At the same time, Allen had written a song called "Don't Worry 'Bout Me Baby" with Bruce Channel and Kieran Kane. Although she pleaded with her record label, Capitol, to let her record it and release it as a single, they refused. With the encouragement of music publisher Don Gant, Janie Fricke's producer, Jim Ed Norman, heard "Don't Worry 'Bout Me Baby" and recorded it with Fricke. The single became Deborah's first No. 1 single on the Billboard charts as a songwriter.

By 1982, she had begun collaborating with Rafe Van Hoy for songwriting. The couple married that year.

In 1983, Deborah moved to RCA Records, where she achieved her greatest success, releasing the album Cheat the Night. The first single from the album, "Baby I Lied", became Allen's signature song and only crossover hit. The song peaked at No. 4 on the Billboard Country chart and crossed over to the Billboard Hot 100, reaching No. 26 in January 1984. The song also climbed into the top 10 of the Adult Contemporary chart. Allen followed the crossover hit with the country single "I've Been Wrong Before", which went to No. 1 on the Cashbox country chart and #2 on the Billboard Country chart in the spring of 1984. It also earned her nominations for the Grammy Award for Best Country Song and Grammy Award for Best Country Vocal Performance, Female. Later that year, "I Hurt for You", also from Allen's breakthrough album, became a top 10 country hit. In 1984, she recorded Let Me Be the First, the first album to be digitally recorded in, and released from, Nashville. In 1984, Allen made the charts once again with "Heartache and a Half" (written by Allen with her then-husband, Rafe Van Hoy and Muscle Shoals songwriter Eddie Struzick).

In 1987, Allen released a single called "Telepathy" written by Prince, under the alias "Joey Coco". An album of the same name was also issued and was considered more pop oriented. In 1987, Allen released her last single for RCA, "You're the Kind of Trouble".

1990s–2000s 
After the No. 1 co-written hit, "Don't Worry 'Bout Me Baby" and the Tanya Tucker hit "Can I See You Tonight", Allen won another No. 1 for Janie Fricke, "Let's Stop Talking About It", as well as the No. 1 John Conlee release, "I'm Only in It for the Love", which she co-wrote with Kix Brooks and Van Hoy.

During this time, Allen recorded the album Delta Dreamland which she co-produced and financed on her own. She then signed a contract with Giant Records to release the album under that label in 1993. The first single released was "Rock Me (In the Cradle of Love)", which charted at No. 29 on the Billboard Country chart. The video of "Rock Me" was filmed on Allen's own 16 mm Ariflex SR film camera and edited on her own Sony editing machine. Allen won the Music City Summit Award for her co-producing and co-directing. Allen also had one other charting single from the Delta Dreamland album with "If You're Not Gonna Love Me".

Allen's 1994 album, All That I Am, which was co-produced by Allen and label head James Stroud, was also well received with her single release "Break These Chains".

In addition to Allen's personal albums, she contributed to the soundtrack of the 1993 film The Thing Called Love performing "Blame It on Your Heart" (also covered by Patty Loveless) and the Don Schlitz ballad "Ready and Waiting".

Allen signed a co-publishing deal and record deal with Curb music publishing and Curb Records. She released one album with Curb Records in 2000, titled The Best Of, that included a new version of her 1983 hit "Baby I Lied". Five of Allen's songs were recorded by LeAnn Rimes. Two of Allen's songs appeared on the multi-platinum Blue album and three songs on her Sittin' on Top of the World album. Allen's song "We Can Get There", performed by Mary Griffin, appeared in the film Coyote Ugly"".

2010s–present
Allen's album Hear Me Now was released through Delta Rock Records and GMV Nashville on August 16, 2011. The first single was "Anything Other Than Love", co-written by Gary Burr. The album also contains Allen's song "Amazing Graceland", a tribute to Elvis Presley.

Allen's publishing companies, Delta Queen Music and Delta Rose Music are currently co-published with partner Delta Rock Music. She is represented by Raymond Hicks of Rolling Thunder Management.

In 2013, she released her first Christmas album, Rockin' Little Christmas, through Weblast Records, and played Christmas shows at the Fontanel Mansion in Nashville, that same year.

On March 22, 2019, Bill Lee, the Governor of Tennessee, officially designated June 5, 2019, as a Day of Recognition to honor Allen.

In 2021, she signed with a new record label, Audium/BFD Nashville. The first single, "Blue Collar Baby", was released in January 2022, followed by her first album for the label, The Art of Dreaming, on March 18, 2022.

 Personal life 
In a 2019 interview with Guitar Girl, Allen shared that she was physically abused by her first husband. Allen lives in Franklin, Tennessee. She is married to music producer and promoter Raymond Hicks. Allen is a Christian. She goes by the name 'Deborah Allen', not to be confused with actress/choreographer Debbie Allen.

 Discography 

 Trouble in Paradise (1980)
 Cheat the Night (1984)
 Let Me Be the First (1993)
 Delta Dreamland'' (1994)

References

External links 

 
Official Videos
 
 Authorized Deborah Allen Baby I Lied Home Page, Founded 1998

American acoustic guitarists
American country guitarists
American women country singers
American country singer-songwriters
Capitol Records artists
Country musicians from Tennessee
Living people
Musicians from Memphis, Tennessee
RCA Records artists
Singer-songwriters from Tennessee
Guitarists from Tennessee
20th-century American women guitarists
20th-century American guitarists
20th-century American women singers
1953 births
People from Franklin, Tennessee
20th-century American singers